|}

This is a list of electoral division results for the Northern Territory 1987 General Election in Australia.

Results by electoral division

Arafura

Araluen

Arnhem

Barkly

Braitling

Casuarina

Fannie Bay

Flynn 

 Two party preferred vote is estimated.

Jingili

Karama

Katherine

Koolpinyah

Leanyer

Ludmilla

MacDonnell

Millner

Nhulunbuy

Nightcliff

Palmerston

Port Darwin

Sadadeen

Sanderson

Stuart

Victoria River

Wanguri

See also 

 1987 Northern Territory general election
 Members of the Northern Territory Legislative Assembly, 1987–1990

References 

Results of Northern Territory elections